In mathematics, the Lie operad is an operad whose algebras are Lie algebras.

Definition à la Ginzburg–Kapranov 
Fix a base field k and let  denote the free Lie algebra over k with generators  and  the subspace spanned by all the bracket monomials containing each  exactly once. The operadic composition is given by substituting expressions (with renumbered variables) for variables. Then,  is an operad.

Koszul-Dual 

Notes

References

External links 
Todd Trimble, Notes on operads and the Lie operad
https://ncatlab.org/nlab/show/Lie+operad

Algebra